Ingram Ord Capper (17 November 1907 − 12 July 1986) was a British sports shooter. He competed in the 100 m running deer event at the 1952 Summer Olympics.

Early life
Capper was the elder son (there being also two daughters) of Captain Robert Harcourt Ord Capper, Prince of Wales's North Staffordshire Regiment, of The Northgate, Herefordshire, by his wife Lilian Georgette, eldest daughter of Conservative politician Wilson Noble, of Park Place, Henley-on-Thames, Berkshire. Lilian Capper was a granddaughter of the American painter William Parsons Winchester Dana. The Capper family, mainly lawyers and clergymen, were landed gentry, of Lyston Court, Ross, Herefordshire. He was noted, as a member of the Bromyard and District Local History Society, to be a descendant of Christopher Capper, of Bromyard, Herefordshire, bailiff of that place, a grazier, and owner of the White Horse Inn on Cruxwell Street.

Career
A stockbroker, Capper served as a Lieutenant in the Royal Navy Volunteer Reserve during World War II.

Later life
Capper lived at Polstead, Suffolk. His daughter, Romayne (1936–1985), married into the family of the Earls of Bradford. His younger brother, Neston Dana Ord Capper (b. 1911), of Lower Hope, Ullingswick, was High Sheriff of Herefordshire in 1971.

References

External links
 

1907 births
1986 deaths
Military personnel from Herefordshire
British male sport shooters
Olympic shooters of Great Britain
Shooters at the 1952 Summer Olympics
People from Ross-on-Wye
Sportspeople from Herefordshire
Royal Naval Volunteer Reserve personnel of World War II
Royal Navy officers of World War II